Braz Cubas is a train station on CPTM Line 11-Coral, located in the city of Mogi das Cruzes. Built next to Avenida Anchieta, the station in close to the commercial center of the district of Brás Cubas, the most populous in Mogi.

History
Braz Cubas station was opened by EFCB as a telegraph post on 20 August 1914. Since 1994, it is operated by CPTM.

The station was a scene of a national commotion crime: on 8 December 2003, two youngsters were thrown through the windows of a train that was leaving Braz Cubas station by 3 skinheads. One of the youngsters died and the other one lost his arm.

References

Companhia Paulista de Trens Metropolitanos stations
Railway stations opened in 1929
Railway stations in Mogi das Cruzes